Defending the Devil: My Story as Ted Bundy's Last Lawyer is a 1994 nonfiction book written by American lawyer Polly Nelson, who was a member of serial killer Ted Bundy's legal defense team from 1986 to his execution in 1989. It was published by William Morrow & Company.

Description
Nelson was Bundy's final lawyer before his execution in 1989. The book describes her attempts to spare Bundy the death penalty, and gives her impressions of him as a person, calling him, "the very definition of heartless evil".

Court case
Nelson sued novelist John Grisham in 1995, alleging his book The Chamber had striking similarities to her work. After Grisham prevailed in a lower court ruling in 1996, the case was dismissed on appeal in 1997.

References

1994 non-fiction books
Non-fiction books about Ted Bundy
William Morrow and Company books